The Meeting of Hendaye, or Interview of Hendaye, took place between Francisco Franco and Adolf Hitler (then respectively Caudillo of Spain and Führer of Germany) on 23 October 1940 at the railway station in Hendaye, France, near the Spanish–French border. The meeting was also attended by the respective foreign ministers, Ramón Serrano Suñer of Francoist Spain and Joachim von Ribbentrop of Nazi Germany.

The object of the meeting was to attempt to resolve disagreements over the conditions for Spain to join the Axis Powers in their war against the British Empire. However, after seven hours of talks, the Spanish demands still appeared extortionate to Hitler: the handing over of Gibraltar once the British were defeated; the cession of French Morocco and part of French Algeria; the attachment of French Cameroon to the Spanish colony of Guinea; and German supplies of food, petrol and arms to relieve the critical economic and military situation faced by Spain after the Spanish Civil War. Hitler did not wish to disturb his relations with the Vichy French regime.

The only concrete result was the signing of a secret agreement under which Franco was committed to entering the war at a date of his own choosing, and Hitler gave only vague guarantees that Spain would receive "territories in Africa". A few days later in Germany, Hitler famously told Benito Mussolini, "I prefer to have three or four of my own teeth pulled out than to speak to that man again!" It is subject to historical debate whether Franco overplayed his hand by demanding too much from Hitler for Spanish entry into the war, or if he deliberately demanded too much to avoid joining the war.

See also
 Spain during World War II
 Spanish occupation of the Tangier International Zone (14 June 1940)
 Military history of Gibraltar during World War II
 Operation Felix

References

Further reading
 Paul Preston, Franco: a biography, Basic Books, 1994. .
 Jane Boyar and Burt Boyar, Hitler stopped by Franco, Marbella House, 2001 (review in Conservative Monitor, August 2001). .
 Stanley G. Payne, Franco and Hitler: Spain, Germany, and World War II, Yale University Press, 2008. .

Politics of World War II
1940 in France
Hendaye
Foreign relations of Spain during the Francoist dictatorship
1940 conferences
Spain in World War II
Germany–Spain relations